The Portuguese legislative election, 1858 was held on 2 May.

Parties
Cartistas
Históricos
Miguelistas

Results

Notes and references

Legislative elections in Portugal
1858 elections in Europe
1858 in Portugal
May 1858 events